Liam Salter (born 4 June 1993) is an English professional rugby league footballer who plays as a  or in the  for the York City Knights in the Championship. He has previously played for Hull Kingston Rovers in the Super League.

Background
Salter was born in Kingston upon Hull, East Riding of Yorkshire, England.

Early career
Salter is a product of the Hull Kingston Rovers' Academy System.

Senior career

Hull Kingston Rovers (2012-18)

2012
Salter made his Hull Kingston Rovers' début on the 17 March 2012, in a 20-12 Super League defeat against the Catalans Dragons at the Stade Gilbert Brutus in Perpignan, France.

2015
Salter represented the club in the 2015 Challenge Cup Final where they were beaten 50-0 by Leeds.

2016
Salter suffered relegation from the Super League with Hull Kingston Rovers in the 2016 season, due to losing the Million Pound Game at the hands of the Salford Red Devils.

2017
12-months later however, Salter was part of the Hull Kingston Rovers' side that won promotion back to the Super League, at the first time of asking following relegation the season prior.

2018
Salter as of the 2018 season was Hull Kingston Rovers' longest-serving player. It was revealed on 10 October 2018, that Salter would be departing Hull Kingston Rovers following a restructure of the club's on field personnel.

York City Knights (2019 - present)

2019
It was revealed on 23 October 2018, that Salter had agreed a deal to play for the York City Knights in the Championship ahead of the 2019 season.
Salter made his début for the York City Knights against the Toronto Wolfpack on 3 February 2019, the game played at Bootham Crescent ended in a 0-14 victory for the Canadians. Salter scored his first try for the York City Knights on 17 February 2019, in a 56-0 victory over the Barrow Raiders.

References

External links
Hull KR profile
SL profile

1993 births
Living people
English rugby league players
Hull Kingston Rovers players
Rugby league centres
Rugby league players from Kingston upon Hull
York City Knights players